Riebeeckstad is a suburb 5 km east of the city of Welkom located in the Lejweleputswa District Municipality of the Free State province of South Africa.

History
It is named after Jan van Riebeeck and was established as an upper-class suburb, void of mine shafts, for people working in Welkom or on the Free State goldfields. The suburb is the largest in the city of Welkom and has a significant white population. Afrikaans is most spoken language in the suburb followed by Sesotho and English. The suburb is located few kilometres from the Central University of Technology in Welkom.

References

Populated places in the Matjhabeng Local Municipality